is a Japanese professional footballer who plays as an attacking midfielder for Kawasaki Frontale and the Japan national team.

Club career
Wakizawa was already in Kawasaki Frontale U-18 team, but he attended Hannan University before joining back Kawasaki for 2018 season, debuting in the AFC Champions League.

International career
He made his debut for Japan national football team on 25 March 2021 in a friendly against South Korea.

Career statistics
.

Honours

Club
Kawasaki Frontale
J1 League: 2018, 2020, 2021
Emperor's Cup: 2020
J.League Cup: 2019
Japanese Super Cup: 2019, 2021

Individual
J.League Best XI: 2021, 2022

References

External links

Profile at Kawasaki Frontale

1995 births
Living people
Hannan University alumni
Association football people from Kanagawa Prefecture
Japanese footballers
Japan international footballers
J1 League players
Kawasaki Frontale players
Association football midfielders